Maxwell Konadu (born 4 December 1972) is a football coach and a retired Ghana international football player. He was the head coach of the Asante Kotoko, the manager of the Ghana national under-23 football team, and formerly the manager of Glo Premier League club Asante Kotoko. Konadu was a member of the Men's National Team that won the bronze medal at the 1992 Summer Olympics in Barcelona, Spain. He also won gold as assistant coach of Ghana's Men's Olympic Team at the All-Africa Games in Maputo, Mozambique in 2011.

Playing career
Konadu began his youth career with Nkoranza Republic and Upper West Republic in Ghana. He began his professional career with the legendary Kumasi Asante Kotoko FC, with whom he won the Ghana Premier League in his debut season.

After brief spells playing in Tunisia and Germany, he returned to Asante Kotoko in January 1996, before moving to U.D. Leiria of the Portuguese second division in July of the following year. He would play for Leiria in the Portuguese Liga during the 1998–99 season, and then moved to rival but relegated lower division club S.C. Beira-Mar, and A.C. Marinhense.

He then had a brief spell playing in Turkey, before returning to play for Ghanaian side King Faisal Babes in 2003.

Coaching career
Following his playing career, Konadu became a coach. first interning at Ghana's Feyenoord Academy before taking on the assistant coach position of Red Bull Academy's U-17 team in Sogakope.

After participating in the 31st and 32nd International DFB (German Football Association) coaching courses in Hennef, Germany, he received the International DFB Coaching Certificates "B" and "A" in 2008 and 2009 respectively. By then, he had moved to Ghana Premier League club All Stars F.C., leading them during the 2009–10 and 2010–11 seasons.

In July 2011, Konadu was appointed as assistant coach of Asante Kotoko, the club where he first gained fame as a prolific goal scorer. He however signed on as head coach following his return from the All-Africa Games in Maputo, Mozambique, following the sacking of Serbian coach Bogdan Korak. On 3 May 2012, Konadu was appointed as the assistant coach of the Ghana national football team by the GFA (Ghana Football Association), succeeding James Kwesi Appiah. On 5 June 2012, Konadu resigned as manager of Glo Premier League club Asante Kotoko after guiding the club to their 22nd league title and securing qualification to the 2013 CAF Champions League. Konadu was succeeded as manager of Asante Kotoko by, Mas-ud Didi Dramani. On 10 July 2012, Konadu was appointed as the manager of the Ghana national under-20 football team, succeeding Orlando Wellington and in January 2013, Konadu was appointed as the manager of the Ghana national under-23 football team.

He was appointed caretaker manager of the men's senior national team, for the second time, in March 2017. He also served as coach of the ''local Black Stars'' - Ghana A' national football team.

Honours

Player 
Asante Kotoko

 Ghana Premier League: 1991–92, 1992–93
Ghana U23

 Summer Olympics Bronze medalist: 1992

Manager 
Asante Kotoko

 Ghana Premier League: 2011–12
 President's Cup: 2019
Ghana A'

 WAFU Nations Cup: 2013, 2017
Individual
 WAFU Nations Cup Coach of the Tournament: 2019
 Ghana Premier League Manager of the month: April 2022

References

External links
 
 
 
 
 

1972 births
Living people
Ghanaian football managers
Ghanaian footballers
Ghana international footballers
Footballers at the 1992 Summer Olympics
Olympic footballers of Ghana
Olympic bronze medalists for Ghana
U.D. Leiria players
S.C. Beira-Mar players
Olympic medalists in football
Ghana national football team managers
Medalists at the 1992 Summer Olympics
Association football forwards
Footballers from Kumasi
Asante Kotoko S.C. managers
Ghana Premier League managers